Buschke–Ollendorff syndrome (BOS) is a rare genetic disorder associated with LEMD3. It is believed to be inherited in an autosomal dominant manner. It is named for Abraham Buschke and Helene Ollendorff Curth, who described it in a 45-year-old woman. Its frequency is almost 1 case per every 20,000 people, and it is equally found in both males and females.

Signs and symptoms

The signs and symptoms of this condition are consistent with the following (possible complications include aortic stenosis and hearing loss):

Osteopoikilosis
Bone pain
Connective tissue nevi
Metaphysis abnormality

Pathogenesis
Buschke–Ollendorff syndrome is caused by one important factor: mutations in the LEMD3 gene (12q14), located on chromosome 12.

Among the important aspects of Buschke–Ollendorff syndrome condition, genetically speaking are:

 LEMD3 (protein) referred also as MAN1, is an important protein in inner nuclear membrane.
 LEMD3 gene gives instructions for producing protein that controls signaling for transforming growth factor-beta.
 LEMD3 gene helps in the bone morphogenic protein pathway
 Both of the above pathways help grow new bone cells
 BMP and TGF-β pathways controls SMADs proteins, which then bind to DNA
 LEMD3 once mutated, causes a reduction of the protein, which in turn causes excess of the above two pathways.

Diagnosis

The diagnosis of this condition can be ascertained via several techniques one such method is genetic testing, as well as:
 X-ray
 Ultrasound
 Histological test

Differential diagnosis
The differential diagnosis for an individual believed to have Buschke–Ollendorff syndrome is the following:
 Melorheostosis
 Sclerotic bone metastases.

Treatment
In terms of the treatment of Buschke–Ollendorff syndrome, should the complication of aortic stenosis occur then surgery may be required.

Treatment for hearing loss may also require surgical intervention.

See also
 Osteopoikilosis
 List of cutaneous conditions
 Melorheostosis

References

Further reading

External links
 

Autosomal dominant disorders
Syndromes
Dermal and subcutaneous growths
Cytoskeletal defects